WXJO AM 1120 was a daytime-only radio station, broadcasting on a frequency of 1120 kHz with a power of 1,000 watts, licensed to serve the city of Douglasville, Georgia and reaching western portions of the metro Atlanta radio market, mainly within Douglas County. The station is currently owned by Exponent Broadcasting, Inc., and operated by Ploener Radio Group under an LMA. The station had originally been broadcasting a variety of music (mostly oldies), and public-service announcements in what appeared to be an early test period since it had been moved to Douglasville.  WXJO's transmitter is co-located with WDCY AM 1520, and the station's signal is diplexed on to WDCY's antenna towers.

In early December 2011, the station began simulcasting on WANN-LD 29, using audio-only digital subchannel 32.27.  The station then broadcast music in Spanish.

On March 4, 2016 WXJO was granted an FCC construction permit to increase power to 10,000 watts daytime only and change the antenna from nondirectional to directional by erecting a second tower.

In January 2016, the owners of WXJO filed an application to the Federal Communications Commission for special temporary authorization to become silent, which was granted. The reason given was "At this time it is not financially feasible to operate WXJO. An application to assign the license to another party is pending".

History
The station went on the air as WCIK in 1968 on 1560 kHz, originally licensed to serve the city of Gordon, Georgia. It moved to 1120 kHz in April 1983. In February 1989, the station changed its broadcast callsign to WYGO. Soon thereafter it changed call signs to WBNM in 1990. In March 2000, the station changed call signs to the current WXJO, previously used on what is now KXBS in Bethalto, Illinois. In 2008, WXJO's city of license was moved to Douglasville from Gordon.

The station flipped to an SB Nation Radio Sports format on April 5, 2017, and then to its current Urban Gospel format on March 5, 2018.

Previous logo

References

External links

XJO
Radio stations established in 1968
1968 establishments in Georgia (U.S. state)
Defunct radio stations in the United States
Defunct religious radio stations in the United States
XJO
XJO